"You Only Live Once" is song by American rock band the Strokes. It is the opening track on their third studio album, First Impressions of Earth (2005). The song was written by Julian Casablancas with production from David Kahne and Gordon Raphael. It was released as the third and final single from the album on September 6, 2006 by RCA and Rough Trade Records. They have performed this song on several programs, including The Tonight Show with Jay Leno and Late Night with Conan O'Brien.

A cover of Marvin Gaye's "Mercy Mercy Me" was recorded as a B-side and features Eddie Vedder of Pearl Jam sharing vocals with Casablancas, while Josh Homme (of Queens of the Stone Age, Them Crooked Vultures and Eagles of Death Metal) plays drums alongside Fabrizio Moretti.

When the song was released as a single, the Strokes launched Operation You Only Live Once prompting all of their fans to call and request the single on radio stations. Their goal was to try to get out the word of the new single as fast as possible, by spreading the song by word of mouth. The Strokes' Myspace page asked all users to put the song in their profile in an attempt to spread the single among the online community.

Demo version: "I'll Try Anything Once"
An early demo version of the song, titled "I'll Try Anything Once", is included as one of the B-sides on the "Heart in a Cage" single. It features Nick Valensi playing electric piano while Casablancas sings. Some of these lyrics were also present when the Strokes played the song for the BBC's Radio 1 Session, which aired on March 8, 2006.

The soundtrack to Sofia Coppola's 2010 film Somewhere included "I'll Try Anything Once". The song also featured prominently in the film's trailer.
This version of the song also featured at the end of the 4th episode in series 4 of ITV's Secret Diary Of A Call Girl.

Reception
Released on July 24, 2006, the single hit No. 35 on the Billboard Alternative Songs chart.
It was listed at No. 16 on Rolling Stone's list of the 100 Best Songs of 2006. In 2020, The Independent and Paste ranked the song number eight and number seven, respectively, on their lists of the 20 greatest Strokes songs.

Music video

The initial music video for the single was directed by Samuel Bayer, who had previously helmed the "Heart in a Cage" video, and features the band performing in an enclosed room as tobacco tar fills the room, implying that the room is their lungs. Julian Casablancas commented on the video saying, "People tell us all the time we're gonna die from smoking, but you only live once."
The video can be seen as a reference to the Rolling Stones' video of It's Only Rock 'n Roll (But I Like It), in which the band can be seen playing in a tent which eventually fills with bubbles. The video was set to premiere in the UK on May 24, 2006, but was delayed, due to last-minute edits, until June 21, 2006. Yahoo! premiered the video in the U.S. on June 27.

An alternate music video for the song, which was directed by Warren Fu, was premiered on the social media site imeem on May 29, 2007. It contains the very end of "Ize of the World" and it works as an homage to 2001: A Space Odyssey and as a video protest against war, hunger, and consumerism.

Track listing

UK, EU 7"
"You Only Live Once" – 3:06
"Mercy Mercy Me (The Ecology)" (feat. Eddie Vedder & Josh Homme) – 2:38

Charts

Certification

References

External links

Alternate video for You Only Live Once

The Strokes songs
2006 singles
Music videos directed by Samuel Bayer
Songs written by Julian Casablancas
2005 songs
Song recordings produced by David Kahne
Music videos directed by Warren Fu